"Meet Virginia" is the debut single of American roots rock band Train, released in 1998 from their self-titled debut album. Originally serviced to adult album alternative radio in March 1998, the song took over a year to gain popularity on mainstream radio, eventually reaching number 20 on the US Billboard Hot 100 chart in January 2000, becoming the band's first top-20 hit and their first single to appear on the Hot 100. It also reached the top 20 in Canada, peaking at number 15 on the RPM 100 Hit Tracks chart.

Background
When asked whether the girl in the song was real or imaginary, Train's Twitter page said, "She's real parts of real woman [sic] that make up a woman that I've always wanted to meet".

Singer Patrick Monahan added that one of the women who inspired the song was bassist Charlie Colin's girlfriend. One day , Train was playing pickup softball with some members of Counting Crows, another Bay area band . Charlie's girlfriend  came over from a wedding shower still wearing a long dress and high heels, and proceeded to play shortstop for Train's team. This inspired the line, "Wears high heels when she exercises".

Reception
Roxanne Blanford of AllMusic says "Meet Virginia" is one of a few songs from the album Train that has "inspired hooks and reflective lyrics". Christa L. Titus, of Billboard magazine in her review of their second album, called the song an "ode to a wrong-side-of-the-tracks girl full of quirky contradictions."

Music video
"Meet Virginia" has a music video that takes place inside a diner and stars actress Rebecca Gayheart. The video was shot at the Merritt Bakery and Restaurant in Oakland, California. Located on the south-western shore of Lake Merritt at 203 East 18th Street. The restaurant closed after a fire in 2016.

Track listing
Australian maxi-CD single
 "Meet Virginia" (pop version) – 3:44
 "Meet Virginia" (album version) – 4:00
 "If You Leave" (live) – 3:26
 "I Am" (live) – 4:35
 "Train" (live) – 5:50

Credits and personnel
Credits are adapted from the US promo CD liner notes.

Studio
 Mastered at A&M Mastering Studios (Hollywood, California, US)

Train
 Train – writing, production
 Patrick Monahan – vocals, percussion
 Rob Hotchkiss – guitars, harmonica, vocals
 Jimmy Stafford – guitars, mandolin, vocals
 Charlie Colin – bass
 Scott Underwood – drums, percussion

Other musicians
 Charlie Gillingham – organ, Mellotron, piano

Additional personnel
 Curtis Mathewson – production
 Mike McHugh – engineering
 Charles Quagliana – engineering
 Matt Wallace – remixing
 Alan Yoshida – mastering

Charts

Weekly charts

Year-end charts

Release history

References

1998 songs
1998 debut singles
Columbia Records singles
Songs written by Pat Monahan
Train (band) songs